Eurya sandwicensis, the ānini or wānini, is a species of flowering plant in the family Pentaphylacaceae, that is endemic to Hawaii. It is threatened by habitat loss.

References

Endemic flora of Hawaii
Trees of Hawaii
sandwicensis
Vulnerable plants
Taxonomy articles created by Polbot